Persephone Swales-Dawson is a British television actress known for playing Nico Blake on Hollyoaks, the Channel 4 drama and soap opera from 2014 to 2016 and in 2018 and 2020 .

References

External links

Living people
English soap opera actresses
English television actresses
British actresses
Year of birth missing (living people)